The Lola T94/00 is an open-wheel racing car chassis, designed and built by Lola Cars that competed in the CART open-wheel racing series, for competition in the 1994 IndyCar season. It wasn't as competitive as its predecessors, only managing to score one win, with Scott Goodyear at the Marlboro 500 in Michigan It was mainly powered by the  Ford/Cosworth XB turbo engine, but also used the Honda turbo Indy V8 engine, and the Ilmor 265-C/D Indy V8 turbo.

References 

Open wheel racing cars
American Championship racing cars
Lola racing cars